Wilfrid Leuchars (26 May 1880 – 27 October 1942) was a sailor from Great Britain, who represented his native country at the 1908 Summer Olympics in Ryde, Great Britain. Leuchars took the 4th place in the 6-Metre.

Sources

British male sailors (sport)
Sailors at the 1908 Summer Olympics – 6 Metre
Olympic sailors of Great Britain
1880 births
1942 deaths